Goadalli CID 999 is a 1968 Indian Kannada-language spy thriller film written, directed and produced by Dorai–Bhagavan duo. The film starred Rajkumar in the lead role as a detective. Popular Indian actress Lakshmi made her debut in Kannada cinema with this film. Sri Lankan based actress Sabeetha Perera also made her Indian movie debut with this film. The film had musical score by G. K. Venkatesh with lyrics by R. N. Jayagopal.The film met with highly positive response upon release and paved the way for many more such Bond style of movies in the combination of the director duo with lead actor Rajkumar.

The film is the second movie in the CID 999 Franchise created along the lines of the James Bond and James Bond - styled films with the first one being Jedara Bale. The success of this movie led to two more sequels - Operation Jackpot Nalli C.I.D 999 and Operation Diamond Racket.

The 2019 Kannada movie Bell Bottom had its protagonist Diwakara being influenced by this movie in his childhood to become a detective.

Cast 
 Rajkumar 
 Lakshmi 
 Sabeetha Perera
 Narasimharaju
 Raghavendra Rao 
 Shakti Prasad
 Jyothi Lakshmi

Soundtrack 
The music of the film was composed by G. K. Venkatesh with lyrics by R. N. Jayagopal. In the course of his Concert in Bangalore on 16.11.2019, Ilaiyaraja himself disclosed that, his 1st assignment as a Sessions Guitarist for the music director G.K. Venkatesh was for the film Goa Dalli CID 999.

References

External links 
 
 Know your film

1968 films
1960s Kannada-language films
Indian black-and-white films
Indian detective films
Films scored by G. K. Venkatesh
Indian crime thriller films
Indian spy thriller films
1960s crime thriller films
1960s spy thriller films
Films directed by Dorai–Bhagavan